Hippios may refer to:

 Poseidon, rendered as a horse
 Kolonos Hippios, a deme of Attica
 Hippios (mythology), the son of Eurynomus
 Hippios (running race), a foot race in the Nemean Games of Ancient Greece

See also
 Hippias (disambiguation)
 Hippo (disambiguation)